The third series of Ross Kemp: Extreme World, a British documentary series, was broadcast on Sky 1 from 21 January and finished on 25 February 2014. Kemp examined the conflicts in Northern Ireland, poverty and corruption in Las Vegas, the crack epidemic in Rio de Janeiro and India's sex-trafficking industry.

Episodes

Ratings

References

Ross Kemp: Extreme World